"Rough Day" is a song by Australian recording artist Paulini, taken from her second studio album, Superwoman (2006). It was written by Bridget Benenate, Matthew Gerrard and Franne Golde, while the production was handled by Audius Mtawarira. "Rough Day" was released physically on 22 January 2006, as the lead single from the album. The song peaked at number 26 on the ARIA Singles Chart and number three on the ARIA Dance Chart. The retro style-themed music video was directed by Jonathan and Josh Baker.

Background and reception
"Rough Day" was written by Bridget Benenate, Matthew Gerrard and Franne Golde, while the production was handled by Audius Mtawarira. The song was recorded in Los Angeles, California. It was sent to Australian radio stations on 5 December 2005, and released as a CD single on 22 January 2006. A writer for Destra Media described "Rough Day" as "a carefree and contagious party starter" that showcases "the sheer class of Paulini's vocal performance". The song debuted and peaked on the ARIA Singles Chart at number 26 on 23 January 2006. "Rough Day" had a better impact on the ARIA Dance Chart, where it peaked at number three.

Music video
The accompanying music video for "Rough Day" was directed by twin brothers Jonathan and Josh Baker. The video features Paulini in the kitchen as she gets ready for work, in a hairdressing salon with her friends, at a bus stop and then on the dancefloor wearing a leopard print dress. A writer for Destra Media described the video as "an absolutely stellar and very groovy retro styled".

Track listing
CD single
 "Rough Day" – 3:29
 "Rough Day (Disco D Remix)" – 3:56
 "Rough Day" (Blue Planet Reality club Mix) – 6:27
 "Last Love" – 3:04

Charts

References

2006 singles
Paulini songs
Rhythm and blues songs
Songs written by Bridget Benenate
Songs written by Matthew Gerrard
Songs written by Franne Golde
2006 songs
Sony Music Australia singles
Song recordings produced by Audius Mtawarira